Anthony Crivello (born August 2, 1955) is an American actor whose portrayals span stage and screen. Notably, he appeared in the original cast of several Broadway shows, including Les Misérables, Kiss of the Spider Woman, Golden Boy, Marie Christine, and The News. In 1993, he won the Tony Award for Best Featured Actor in a Musical for his performance as Valentin in Kiss of the Spider Woman.

Early life 
Crivello was born in Milwaukee, Wisconsin, the son of Josephine (née Mussomeli) and Vincent J. Crivello. He graduated from Saint Rita’s Grade School on Milwaukee’s East Side, and then Saint Thomas More High School in 1973. He was inducted into the Saint Thomas More Alumni Hall of Fame in 1995. Early in his career, he appeared in 12 community theater productions, including three at Sunset Playhouse, directed by Alan Furlan and Mary H. Strong. He married actress/commercial talent agent Dori Rosenthal on May 14, 2005, and they have two children together.

Career 
Crivello is a member of the Actors' Equity Association, SAG/AFTRA, Dramatists Guild of America and the Writers Guild of America.

He is a lifetime member of the Actors Studio (NYC/LA). His former acting teachers include: Tony Greco, Estelle Parsons, Harvey Keitel, Barbara Bain, Martin Landau as well as Michael Howard, Terry Schreiber and Mary H. Strong. His vocal coach for over thirty years is Anne Perillo/DePaul University. He studied comic improv with Del Close at the famed The Second City in Chicago.

Crivello is an Honored Member of Marquette University's Century of Scholarship. He was the recipient of Marquette University's College of Speech & Communications distinguished 2003 Communicator of the Year Award. He is listed in Who's Who in America, and is an outstanding member of the Saint Thomas More High School Alumni Hall of Fame. He was inducted into the Marquette University Hall of Fame with his image displayed in Johnston Hall in the Diederich College of Communication on the campus of Marquette University. A caricature of his likeness can be found on the walls of the famed Sardi's Restaurant in New York City. He has the honor of being subject matter for the New York Times caricature artist Al Hirschfeld four times, as well as being depicted in several published drawings, including those in the Washington Post and London Times.

In 2008, Crivello was the host of his own radio show on FOX SPORTS/ 920 AM Las Vegas called Tony Crivello and The Sicilians. Mr. Crivello has also moonlighted as a ring announcer & commentator for ESPN2's Kickboxing Championships, and owns stock with the NFL's Green Bay Packers.

He has written several pieces for stage and screen.

Theater 
Between bookings for commercial modeling, Crivello finally got his “Equity Card” in Milwaukee’s Melody Top Theatre in their production of “Bye-Bye Birdie” starring as Conrad Birdie opposite Lucy Arnaz and Michael Callan at the age of 19. It was there after a performance he met Lucy’s mother famed actress/comedian Lucille Ball who advised him “It’s time for the little ‘Birdie’ to leave the nest!” He broke into the Chicago Theatre scene in 1979, originating the role of "Felix 'The Filth Fiend' Linder" in the original cast of John R. Powers' Do Black Patent Leather Shoes Really Reflect Up? at Chicago's Forum Theater opposite a young Brad Hall, Chloe Webb and Megan Mullally. Shortly thereafter, he was cast in the 2nd National Touring company of Evita by director theatre icon Harold Prince in 1980, receiving glowing reviews for his performance as “Che". Subsequently at Mr. Prince’s request, he made his Broadway debut as a replacement for Mandy Patinkin in the original Broadway production of Evita in 1981, taking over the starring role of "Che" for which he received critical praise.

After completing his “Evita” run, he appeared Off-Broadway in Wendy Kesselman's The Juniper Tree as well as The Lincoln Center production of Shakespeare's Measure For Measure directed by Mark Lamos.

He then appeared in the musical The News starring as “The Killer”, first in Jupiter, Florida receiving a Carbonelle Award for “Outstanding Performance by a Lead Actor.” He performed that same role at Westport Country Playhouse, and then on Broadway at the Helen Hayes Theater. He was an original Broadway cast member of Alain Boublil and Claude-Michel Schonberg's Les Misérables for directors Trevor Nunn and John Caird and producer Cameron Mackintosh, first as Grantaire, and ten months later taking over the leading role of Javert. (He would later play Grantaire once again in a special tenth-anniversary concert at the Royal Albert Hall, London in the “The Dream Cast/10th Anniversary Production of Les Miserables in Concert.) He continued his prominence in leading roles on Broadway as "Valentin" in the Kander and Ebb Terrence McNally musical Kiss of the Spider Woman in 1993 directed by the incomparable Harold Prince. For his performance, he was nominated for a Dora Mavor Moore Award while in try-outs in Toronto. He then originated the same role in London’s West End Production of “Kiss” prior to it’s Broadway engagement. For his portrayal, Crivello won Broadway's 1993 Tony Award as "Best Featured Actor in a Musical." In 1999, he starred opposite Audra McDonald in Michael John LaChiusa's Marie Christine directed by Graciela Daniele at The Lincoln Center's Vivian Beaumont Theater on Broadway. Two years later, he received a Los Angeles Ovation Award nomination, a Garland Award nomination, a Robby Award nomination, and a Los Angeles Drama Critics Award nomination for "Outstanding Performance by a Lead Actor in a Musical" for Do I Hear a Waltz? at the Pasadena Playhouse directed by David Lee.

Crivello starred in the Goodman Theater of Chicago production of The House Of Martin Guerre for which he received Chicago's Joseph Jefferson Award for his portrayal of Martin Guerre. In August 2005, he appeared at the La Jolla Playhouse in San Diego, California in a workshop production of Zhivago, a musicalization of the Boris Pasternak novel by Marsha Norman and Lucy Simon, and directed by Des McAnuff. He starred in the Steve Martin adaptation of The Underpants at the Geffen Playhouse, directed by John Rando, as well as David Ives' adaptation of A Flea in Her Ear for the Chicago Shakespeare Theater directed by Gary Griffin for which he received his second Joseph Jefferson Award nomination. He starred in the John Caird and Paul Gordon musical Jane Eyre, first in 1994 while in development in Wichita, KS and then in the 1996 Toronto staging of “Jane Eyre.” Mr. Crivello received a second Dora Mavor Moore nomination in Canada for his portrayal of Edward Fairfax Rochester with that production.

In 2006, he was cast by director Hal Prince as one of two actors rotating in the title role in the Las Vegas production of The Phantom of the Opera. Subsequently, he was cast as the sole actor playing “The Phantom." Closing in September 2012, he appeared in over 2,400 performances.

He starred in the Lincoln Center 75th Anniversary revival of Clifford Odets' Golden Boy at the Belasco Theatre in New York City, produced by Lincoln Center Theater in 2012–2013, with a star studded cast which included Tony Shalhoub, Seth Numrich, and Yvonne Strahovski, Michael Aronov and directed by Bartlett Sher. In 2014, he starred in the Kevin Murphy / Laurence O'Keefe cult hit Heathers Off-Broadway in New York City at New World Stages, and directed by Andy Fickman.

In 2015 and 2016, Crivello starred in producer Hershey Felder's production of Louis and Keely Live at the Sahara directed by Taylor Hackford, and written by Hackford, Vanessa Claire Stewart and Jake Broder. The musical was performed at the Royal George Theatre in Chicago, as well as the Geffen Playhouse in Los Angeles. Stewart played the role of Keely Smith to Crivello's 'Las Vegas Lounge Legend' Louis Prima. He received his third Joseph Jefferson Award nomination for his performance as “Louis" in 2015.

In 2017, Crivello portrayed the late Marquette University Naismith Basketball Hall Of Fame 1977 NCAA basketball championship coach / NBC broadcaster Al McGuire in the Milwaukee Repertory Theater one man play McGuire, written by HOF broadcaster Dick Enberg. Crivello received critical praise for his work in the show and won the 2017 Wisconsin Footlights Award for Outstanding Performance by a Leading Actor in a Play. An eight-minute presentation of McGuire was presented at the 2017 Wisconsin Sports Awards on May 20, 2017, at the University of Wisconsin Field House. Crivello reprised his award winning performance in McGuire in a relaunched new touring production in 2022 at Milwaukee's Next Act Theatre, produced by Bob Rech and Rech Entertainment, and directed by Edward Morgan.

In 2019, Crivello portrayed "The Old Man" Santiago in Ernest Hemingway's The Old Man and the Sea, adapted for the stage by A. E. Hotchner and Tim Hotchner, presented at the Pittsburgh Playhouse on the campus of Point Park University, directed by Ronald Allan-Lindblom and produced by RWS Entertainment Group of New York City/Long Island City, receiving critical praise for his work.

In July 2019, Crivello made his Hollywood Bowl debut as "The Mysterious Man" in a star studded assembled cast in Stephen Sondheim’s Into the Woods directed by Robert Longbottom.

He has also performed comic improv Off-Broadway and is a resident company alumni of Chicago City Limits in New York City.

Television and film 
Crivello started his feature film work co-starring in two films: Crocodile Dundee II opposite Paul Hogan in 1988, and Shakedown opposite Sam Elliott. He then starred in director Janet Greek's MGM film Spellbinder opposite Tim Daly and Kelly Preston. He was featured in director James Ivory's comedy Slaves of New York opposite Bernadette Peters in 1989.

Crivello co-starred in the Jim Abrahams film comedy Mafia! opposite Sofia Milos and Jason Fuchs (1998), Texas Rangers (2001) opposite Alfred Molina, director Martha Coolidge's Material Girls (2006) opposite Hilary and Haylie Duff, Independence Day, and Trade opposite Kevin Kline (2007). In 1992, Crivello starred in the short film The Bet for director Ted Demme. Crivello has also starred in the independent short films Petal Of A Rose, Henry Toy for director Anthony Engelken in 2014, and received critical praise for his work as "Boonie" in director Taryn Kosviner's NYShorts Festival's The Mark in 2016.

In 2016, he starred in the Hallmark Television movie Emma's Chance opposite Joey Lawrence, Greer Grammer and Missi Pyle. Director John Gray had him starring in his television movie The Lost Capone opposite Adrian Pasdar, Titus Welliver, Ally Sheedy and Eric Roberts. In 1995 he starred in Dillinger and Capone opposite Martin Sheen and F. Murray Abraham, and Monster Mash: The Movie for directors Joel Cohen and Alex Sokolow. He also appeared in Dominic Dunne's 919 Fifth Avenue.  1996 he followed with Alien Avengers opposite George Wendt. In 2000, he was featured in the Wonderful World Of Disney made-for-television musical Geppetto opposite Drew Carey and Julia Louis-Dreyfus. In 1988, Crivello guest starred as Miguel Carrera in Miami Vice directed by Don Johnson.

Crivello has guest starred on the science fiction television series Star Trek: Voyager, Team Knight Rider, and Babylon 5. He also co-starred in director Ron Krauss's SciFi Channel/SONY film Alien Hunter opposite James Spader. He has appeared in numerous sitcoms, including Seinfeld opposite Jerry Seinfeld and Michael Richards directed by Andy Ackerman, Frasier opposite Kelsey Grammer and David Hyde Pierce, In-Laws opposite Dennis Farina, Jean Smart, Bonnie Somerville and Elon Gold directed by Steve Zuckerman, and Normal, Ohio opposite John Goodman. Crivello has had roles in a number of police procedurals, including CSI: New York and Law & Order.

In 2013, he appeared in the Liberace biopic Behind the Candelabra, directed by Steven Soderbergh. Crivello appeared as British film director David Lean in director/producer Ryan Murphy's 2017 FOX miniseries Feud opposite Jessica Lange as Joan Crawford and Susan Sarandon as Bette Davis.

In 2021, he appeared in Black Easter.

In 2022, Crivello completed principal photography, starring as "Joe" in the independent feature film Children of God. Additionally in 2023, he will recur as a comedic officious butler “Sebastian” at “Snickering Mansion” in Disney’s new comedic anthology Pretty Freekin Scary.

He starred in the ABC Daytime series One Life to Live as mobster Johnny Dee Hesser from 1990 to 1991. He has also appeared on the daytime series The Bold and The Beautiful and The Guiding Light.

Stage appearances 
 1979–80 – Do Black Patent Leather Shoes Really Reflect Up? Forum Theatre, Chicago
 1981–83 – (Broadway debut) Che, Evita (musical), Broadway Theatre, New York City, 1981–83
 1983 – The Juniper Tree St. Clement's Theatre
 1985 – The News, Helen Hayes Theatre, New York City, The Killer
 1985 – Three Guys Naked from the Waist Down; (workshop) prior to Minetta Lane Theatre; NYC
 1987–89 – Les Misérables – Broadway Theatre (53rd Street); Original Grantaire/Bamatabois and later Javert
 1989 – Father Thomas/Barnardine, Measure for Measure, Vivian Beaumont Theater, Lincoln Center, New York City
 1992–95 – Valentin, Kiss of the Spider Woman, Canadian production, London West End, Broadhurst Theatre, NYC
 1995 – Father Ladislao Gutierrez, Camila, Theatre at St. Paul's, New York City
 1995 – Les Misérables: The Dream Cast in Concert: Live from Royal Albert Hall, London; Grantaire
 1995 – Frankie and Johnny in the Clair de Lune, Milwaukee Chamber Theatre, Milwaukee, WI
 1996 – The House of Martin Guerre, Goodman Theater, Chicago 1996
 1994–96 – Rochester, Jane Eyre, Wichita, KS. 1994, Royal Alexandra Theatre, Toronto, Ontario, Canada, 1996
 1999–2000 – Marie Christine, Vivian Beaumont Theater, Lincoln Center, New York City
 2000 – Expecting Isabel, Mark Taper Forum, Los Angeles
 2001 – Do I Hear a Waltz?, Pasadena Playhouse, Pasadena, CA
 2003 – Romantique, American Repertory Theater, Loeb Drama Center, Cambridge, MA
 2003 – Assassins (concert performance), Freud Playhouse, University of California, Los Angeles; Guiseppe Zangara
 2004 – Kismet (musical), Freud Playhouse, UCLA; LA
 2004 – The Underpants, Geffen Playhouse, Los Angeles
 2005 – Zhivago (musical), Sheila and Hughes Potiker Theatre, La Jolla Playhouse
 2006 – A Flea in Her Ear, Chicago Shakespeare Theater
 2006–12 – The Phantom of the Opera Las Vegas Spectacular, ''The Venetian Las Vegas, Role of The Phantom
 2012–13 – Golden Boy – Lincoln Center, New York City
 2014 – Heathers: The Musical; Off Broadway original cast, 2014
 2015–16 – Louis and Keely Live at the Sahara, Royal George Theatre, Chicago and Geffen Playhouse, Los Angeles
 2016 – Evita Studio Tenn, Nashville, Juan Perón
 2017 – McGuire, Milwaukee Repertory Theater, Milwaukee, Al McGuire
 2019 – The Old Man and the Sea (stage adaptation), Pittsburgh Playhouse, Santiago
2019 - Into the Woods, Hollywood Bowl, The Mysterious Man
 2022 - McGuire, Next Act Theatre, Milwaukee, Al McGuire

Discography 
 Phantom: The Las Vegas Spectacular (The Phantom Of The Opera)
 Kiss of the Spider Woman (Original Broadway Cast)
 Marie Christine (Original Broadway Cast)
 Jane Eyre (Toronto, Canada – Original Cast)
 Les Misérables (Original Broadway Cast)
 Les Miserables – 10th Anniversary 'The Dream Cast' in Concert-live from Royal Albert Hall, London
 Do I Hear a Waltz? (Pasadena Playhouse)
 Heathers: The Musical (Original Off-Broadway Cast)
 Cabaret Noel: A Broadway Cares Christmas
 Living Water: Wasser Fur Die Welt (Germany)
 Andreas Vollenweider's Dancing With The Lion (Guest Artist)
 Lucid Structure: Measures (vocals on "Village of Sand")
 The Prince of Egypt – Playing with the Big Boys Demo (with Stephen Schwartz) 1998
 Cry To Heaven by Matthew Wilder – Demo
 Lucky Lucy and The Fortune Man by Corinna Manetto and Ronald Bazarini – Demo
 "Love Is Worth It If Together We've Cried" co-written with Eric Allaman, from the soundtrack from the film "Midnight Blue"
 "Ave Maria" from the soundtrack for the film The Glass Jar
 Night Of A Thousand Voices, A Tribute to John Kander and Fred Ebb – Live from Royal Albert Hall, London, 2007
 The News by Paul Schierhorn – Demo
 Deep Song – music by Mchael Moricz, lyrics by Eduardo Machado and Michael Moricz Demo
 Wake Up – Music by Eric Allaman Demo
 Kiss of the Spider Woman (Original Toronto Cast Press Demo)

Filmography 
 1979: Bog
 1988: Crocodile Dundee II
 1988: Shakedown
 1988: Spellbinder
 1989: Slaves of New York
 1990: The Lost Capone
 1992: The Bet
 1995: Dillinger and Capone
 1995: Monster Mash: The Movie
 1996: Alien Avengers
 1996: Independence Day
 1997: Twisted
 1998: Jane Austen's Mafia!
 2001: Texas Rangers
 2003: Alien Hunter
 2006: Material Girls
 2006: Trade
 2014: Henry Toy (short)
 2016: Emma's Chance
 2016: The Mark (short)
 2021: Black Easter
 2022: Children of God

Television 
 1988 – Miguel Carrera, "Hostile Takeover," Miami Vice, NBC
 1990 – Celine, "Prisoner of Love," Law & Order, NBC
 1990 – Johnny Dee, One Life to Live, ABC
 1995 – 919 Fifth Avenue (also known as Dominick Dunne's 919 Fifth Avenue)
 1996 – Adin, "Warlord," Star Trek: Voyager, UPN
 1996 – Grantaire, Les Misérables: The Dream Cast in Concert – Live from London's Royal Albert Hall, Great Performances PBS
 1997 – Linder, "Everything to Fear," Team Knight Rider
 1998 – John, "No Compromises," Babylon 5
 1998 – Maxwell, "The Maid," Seinfeld, NBC
 2000 – Reverend Burns, "Just Another Normal Christmas," Normal, Ohio, Fox Broadcasting Company
 2002 – Band leader, "Love Is the Key," In-Laws, NBC
 2003 – "Strangled," Crossing Jordan, NBC
 2003 – Maître d', "The Placeholder," Frasier, NBC
 2005 – Ringmaster, "Blood, Sweat, and Tears," CSI: NY, CBS
 2013 – Stage Hand, Behind the Candelabra HBO
 2015 – Valentin, Great Performances Kiss of the Spider Woman, PBS – Chita Rivera: A Lot of Livin' to Do
 2017 – David Lean, Feud: Bette and Joan; FX
 2022 - Sebastian, “Streak Life” and others Pretty Freekin Scary, Disney

Other work

Voice overs 
Nobody Studios/Promotional-Parentipity
Crazy Ex-Girfriend/Looping-CW Network
Mistresses/Looping-ABC
Nascar/VO / TV Spot-NBC
The Black List (Promo)-NBC
Domino's/"Braveheart" Manager
Atlantic Bell Telephone/Pizza Restaurant Owner

Video games 
Witches/Formosa Interactive
Midnight/Formosa Interactive
Ubisoft/Company CEO 'Tony'/Ubisoft
Hot Shots Golf Fore!/SONY PlayStation

Commercials 
Peugeot (UK/Europe)/Principal Performer
Silo Audio/Video NYC
Cherry 7-up /Leo Burnett
Security Force/ "Monsters"/Frankenstein
FIAT 500 "Tony Fixes It" SUV 2015 /Tony
FIAT / Various TV- Internet/ Funny or Die
FIAT 500 "Tony Fixes It" SEDAN 2015 /Tony
FIAT / Various TV- Internet/ Funny or Die

Audio books 
 Calvin The Christmas Tree
 Christmas Is
 Christmas Is Special Things
 Grandma's Spooky House
 Winston Has Lunch

References

External links 
 
 
darkestnight: the works of Alain Boubil & Claude-Michel Schönberg
BroadwayWorld.com interview with Anthony Crivello, June 23, 2007
"'Louis and Keely' Finds its Louis and Keely"

1955 births
Living people
Male actors from Milwaukee
American male film actors
American male musical theatre actors
American male voice actors
Marquette University alumni
Tony Award winners
20th-century American male actors
21st-century American male actors
20th-century American male singers
20th-century American singers
21st-century American male singers
21st-century American singers